Naked Gun : The Final Insult is a 1994 American crime comedy film, and the third and final installment in The Naked Gun film series, which was based on the television series Police Squad!.

The "" in the title is a reference to the number of revolutions per minute at which long playing (LP) phonograph records play. The film was originally going to be titled  The Naked Gun : Just for the Record, but was changed after the studio felt that audiences would not get the joke. It was also going to simply be titled The Naked Gun 3: The Final Insult, according to some Christmas 1993 video previews.

Leslie Nielsen returns as Lieutenant Frank Drebin (his original character from Police Squad!), along with Priscilla Presley as Jane Spencer Drebin, O. J. Simpson as Officer Nordberg and George Kennedy as Captain Ed Hocken. Newcomers to the series Fred Ward, Anna Nicole Smith, and Kathleen Freeman co-star as a gang of bombers set to blow up the Academy Awards ceremony. Raye Birk reprises his role as the villainous Pahpshmir from The Naked Gun: From the Files of Police Squad!.

Plot
Frank Drebin has retired from Police Squad and lives a seemingly happy life with his wife, Jane Spencer Drebin. In reality, Frank is unfulfilled as a househusband and attends marriage counseling with Jane. Six months after Frank's retirement he is visited by Ed Hocken and Nordberg, who ask for his help with an investigation. Police Squad has learned that infamous bomber Rocco Dillon, who is currently incarcerated, has been hired by terrorists to conduct a bombing against the United States. Frank remembers Rocco's girlfriend Tanya Peters from an investigation years ago and agrees to help Ed and Nordberg by visiting the clinic where Peters works.

Frank visits the clinic and writes Tanya's address on a handkerchief, but loses it before he can give it to Ed. Jane comes home to an exhausted Frank and accuses him of doing police work again. Frank lies and swears he is having an affair, but Jane does not believe him and moves out of their house. With nothing else to lose, Frank volunteers to go undercover in prison to befriend Dillon and learn the details of the bombing. Frank is put in Rocco's cell under the name Nick "The Slasher" McGuirk. He wins Rocco's trust after protecting their escape plan from a guard and causing a riot. Rocco and Frank escape through a tunnel in their cell and are picked up on the outside by Rocco's mother Muriel. At Rocco's hideout, Frank attempts to get information on the bombing out of Rocco and his mother, but they are suspicious of him and refuse to share details.

Meanwhile, Jane and her friend Louise are on a road trip together when Jane finds the handkerchief with Tanya's address on it. Believing Frank was being truthful about the affair, Jane decides to drive cross-country to the address to find Frank. When she arrives, Frank answers the door and must quickly cover for her; he convinces the Dillons that Jane is a random stranger but that they should keep her as a hostage. Rocco finally reveals his plan to Frank: he will attack the Academy Award ceremony with a bomb hidden in the Best Picture envelope.

At the Awards, Frank traps Muriel in the car and sneaks in with Jane to search for the bomb. Frank and Jane frantically search for the bomb, with Frank inflicting his usual chaos on stage during the show. Frank encounters Tanya backstage and she  attempts to seduce Frank as a distraction. She undresses and her shadow on the wall reveals a large penis, causing Frank to vomit into a tuba in the orchestra. Frank bursts onto the stage and tries to stop the detonation of the bomb but ends up in a stalemate with Rocco. Frank drops an electronic sign which takes out Muriel. Rocco decides to detonate the bomb and die with his mother, but Frank launches Rocco and the bomb into the catwalks above the stage.  Frank snares Rocco with a cable and slings him through the roof of the arena. Rocco crashes into Pahpshmir's helicopter hovering overhead and the bomb explodes, killing them both. Frank and Jane reaffirm their love to the applause of the audience and viewers worldwide.

Nine months later, Frank and Nordberg rush into a delivery room to witness the birth of Frank's child.  They run into the wrong room and Frank is shown a black baby, causing him to angrily chase Nordberg.  Ed comes out of another room with Jane, who is holding their real baby.

Cast

Production

This is the only film in the series to be directed by Peter Segal, rather than David Zucker, who instead received credit for writing the screenplay. Similar to the previous entry in the series, Jim Abrahams and Jerry Zucker did not write the film's script, but both returned as executive producers and received writing credits due to their contributions to Police Squad! and the first film.

Several scenes had been planned for the earlier films but cut out. The opening sequence had been planned for the first film. The scene where Frank and Jane get married, then drive off with Nordberg on the back of the car, was shot for the second film. In the latter, the car being driven is the electric car featured in the second film.

In the opening scene at the train station, the woman with the baby carriage who is assisted by Frank Drebin is played by Susan Breslau, the sister of Jerry and David Zucker.

The dream sequence parodies the train-station shoot-out from the 1987 film The Untouchables, which is itself a homage to the "Odessa Steps" montage in Sergei Eisenstein's famous 1925 silent movie Battleship Potemkin.

Director Peter Segal, in addition to playing the producer of Sawdust and Mildew, also has several minor roles in the film (mostly in voiceover):
 The voice of the suicide bomber in The Untouchables (1987) parody at the start of the film.
 The voice of the K.S.A.D. DJ.
 The ADR'ed scream of the inmate escaping prison by pole-vaulting.
 The real Phil Donahue, before Frank knocks him out and takes his place.
 The voice of the man shouting "Stop the stairs, Joey!" at the Academy Awards.

Reception

Box office
The film grossed over $51 million in the United States and Canada and $81 million internationally, for a worldwide total of $132 million. However, this would be the lowest-grossing film of the Naked Gun series. Still,  managed to grab the No. 1 weekend box office title in the U.S. during its opening weekend (the other Naked Guns did as well).

Critical response
Naked Gun : The Final Insult received mixed reviews from critics. The film holds a 56% rating on Rotten Tomatoes, based on 36 reviews, with an average rating of 5.6/10. The website's critical consensus reads, "Naked Gun : The Final Insult can't help but be sporadically funny thanks to Leslie Nielsen's dependably solid work, but it's still a steep comedown from the original." On Metacritic it has a weighted average score of 63% based on reviews from 21 critics, indicating "generally favorable reviews." Audiences surveyed by CinemaScore gave the film a grade "B+" on scale of A to F.

Peter Rainer of the Los Angeles Times praised the opening sequence, which parodied The Untouchables, and the climax at the Academy Awards,  but felt the middle was uninspired, and that the film overall had too little plotting and relied too much on comedy without the romantic or action elements of the previous films. Others felt that the humor was weak and too similar to that of the previous films. Roger Ebert of the Chicago Sun-Times gave the film three out of four stars, the same rating he gave to The Naked Gun 2½: The Smell of Fear.

The movie won two Golden Raspberry Awards: Worst Supporting Actor for O.J. Simpson and Worst New Star for Anna Nicole Smith.

Year-end lists
 10th – David Stupich, The Milwaukee Journal
 Honorable mention – Jeff Simon, The Buffalo News
 3rd worst – John Hurley, Staten Island Advance

Cameo appearances
Numerous celebrities have cameo appearances in the film, both in credited and uncredited roles.

As themselves:

 Diahann Carroll – uncredited
 Shannen Doherty – uncredited
 Vic Damone – uncredited
 Olympia Dukakis
 Morgan Fairchild – uncredited
 Elliott Gould
 Mariel Hemingway – uncredited
 Florence Henderson
 James Earl Jones
 Mary Lou Retton
 Raquel Welch
 Vanna White
 "Weird Al" Yankovic (previously appeared in The Naked Gun as himself and in The Naked Gun  as the police station thug)
 Pia Zadora

As minor characters:
 Joe Grifasi as the director of the Academy Awards (previously appeared as the Pier 32 Dockman in The Naked Gun)
 Ann B. Davis as "Alice" from The Brady Bunch (credited as playing herself)
 Marc Alaimo as the trucker
 R. Lee Ermey (The Gunny) as the mess hall guard – uncredited
 Bill Erwin as the Orchestra Conductor at the Academy Awards
 Julie Strain as the dominatrix
 Rosalind Allen as Bobbi the Soap Opera Actress
 Earl Boen as Dr. Eisendrath
 Robert K. Weiss as Tuba Player
 Peter Segal, Robert LoCash and William Kerr as producers of Sawdust and Mildew
 Paul Feig as Oscars audience member
 Tim Bohn as Waldo
 Timothy Watters as Bill Clinton
 Eugene Greytak as Pope John Paul II
 Randall "Tex" Cobb as Big Hairy Con
 Doris Belack as Dr. Roberts
 Lois de Banzie as Dr. Kohlzac
 Chrissy Bocchino as Mother Teresa

Related litigation

An image used on the promotional poster for the film parodies a famous portrait photograph by Annie Leibovitz which was featured on the August 1991 cover of Vanity Fair magazine. The original photograph showed a pregnant, nude Demi Moore, and the parody photograph showed Leslie Nielsen in a similar pose. Leibovitz sued Paramount for copyright infringement; the Second Circuit deemed the use to be protected under fair use because of its transformative parodic purpose.

Cancelled fourth movie 
In 2009 it was revealed that a fourth movie starring Leslie Nielsen was coming out as a direct-to-TV sequel, and that it was going to be about Frank train a young rookie. The film was given the title The Naked Gun 4: Rhythm of Evil. The script was apparently thought to be really funny but, but due to financial reasons, it was canned back in 2009. The script was written by Alan Spencer. The original writers of the first movie, the Zucker-Abrahams-Zucker team tried to stop it from happening. According to Alan Spencer, he signed on to write the film as a “rescue mission” to save an inferior sequel from happening. The script impressed the Paramount folks and online reviewers so much that it was briefly shifted to the theatrical department. Spencer wrote a sizable role for Leslie Nielsen, who would be passing the torch to a new generation on incompetent cops, but Paramount asked him to reduce the part to a cameo for budgetary reasons and then decided to remove Nielsen's character altogether. Spencer then left the project when he was asked to take Nielsen's character out, and the movie never got made.

Since 2013 Paramount has been working on a reboot of the franchise.

References

External links
 
 
 

1994 films
1990s parody films
1990s police comedy films
1990s screwball comedy films
American screwball comedy films
American slapstick comedy films
American prison comedy films
American sequel films
1990s English-language films
Films scored by Ira Newborn
Films directed by Peter Segal
Films using stop-motion animation
Films with screenplays by Pat Proft
Films with screenplays by David Zucker (filmmaker)
The Naked Gun
Paramount Pictures films
Transgender-related films
1994 directorial debut films
1994 comedy films
Golden Raspberry Award winning films
Films produced by Robert K. Weiss
1990s American films